Daniel Cornelius Faasen (born 11 November 1989) is a South African rugby union player.

Career

He also represented  in the 2011 Varsity Cup.

After two years at the Kings, he left and rejoined  for the 2013 Varsity Cup. He didn't play any first class rugby in 2013 despite being named in the  Currie Cup squad, but joined George-based side  prior to the 2014 season.

In 2014, Faasen moved to Italy to play for Serie A side Rugby Badia. After one season at Badia, Faasen joined National Championship of Excellence side L'Aquila.

References

External links
 
 
 

South African rugby union players
Eastern Province Elephants players
Living people
1989 births
University of Pretoria alumni
Blue Bulls players
SWD Eagles players
Rugby union scrum-halves
Rugby union players from Mpumalanga